ConnectedDrive is a collection of electronic features for BMW vehicles. 

ConnectedDrive was introduced in 2008 at the Geneva Motor Show as a web browser built into the car's infotainment system. Additional features have been added since, such as smartphone integration, synchronising with calendars, heads-up display, lane departure warning system, active cruise control, night vision and traffic information.

2015 security flaw 
In 2015, ADAC (a German motoring association) discovered security flaws in the ConnectedDrive system which potentially allowed attackers to remotely unlock the vehicle. To fix this flaw, BMW released a security update, which was automatically installed via the Internet. There are no reports of the flaw being used to gain unauthorised access to a vehicle.

References 

Automotive technology tradenames
BMW
In-car entertainment
Vehicle telematics